Queensway is a major road in the Admiralty area of Central, Hong Kong. It was originally a section of Queen's Road East and forms part of the continuum of Queen's Road that had been split into Queen's Road West, Queen's Road Central, Queensway, and Queen's Road East after World War II. At its western end it splits into Queen's Road Central and Des Voeux Road Central while at its eastern end it merges into Hennessy Road, at the junction with Queen's Road East.

Name
Queensway was formally separated and given its own name when the extensive military and naval sites that dominated this area were redeveloped around the 1960s. Its Chinese name can be translated as Golden Bell Road, a reference to a notable bell once located in the adjacent Admiralty Dock, and does not include 'Queen'.

The road is one of only a handful in the territory to have a name consisting of a single word. Other examples are Glenealy (Central), Smithfield (Kennedy Town) and Broadway (Lai Chi Kok). As a result, the road is often mistakenly referred to as Queensway Road

Important buildings

The road is home to a large amount of landmarks, with its northbound lane housing landmarks such as the Cheung Kong Centre; Bank of China Tower; Hong Kong Park (including Flagstaff House and the Museum of Tea Ware); Queensway Government Offices; the High Court; and the Swire-owned Pacific Place, a shopping centre and office tower complex incorporating the Conrad, Island Shangri-La and Marriott hotels, while its southbound lane houses Chater Garden, site of Hong Kong's former main cricket ground; the Lippo Centre; Queensway Plaza – a one-storey shopping mall next to the United Centre office block, also linked to Pacific Place opposite by means of a fully enclosed skywalk; the small Harcourt Garden; and, at the Wan Chai end, the Hong Kong Police Headquarters.

Military history
Until the 1980s, both sides of the road were British military sites. To its south were Wellington Barracks, Murray Barracks and Victoria Barracks, while to the north lay the Admiralty Dock. Flagstaff House was the residence of the Commander British Forces of Hong Kong between 1842 and 1978. These were gradually replaced as Central district expanded.

Layout
The road was formerly not as straight as at present. Two close bends in the midsection (between Rodney Block and Naval Terrace, neither of which remains) formed an S-shape, known as the death bend of Queensway (金鐘道死亡彎角) as it was the site of frequent traffic accidents, especially between vehicles and trams. Straightening of the road was planned from as early as 1968 and finally carried out in 1974 with the official completion taking place on 12 January 1975.

Present-day Queensway is much wider than it used be. Its carriageways are separated by the lines of the famous Hong Kong trams. At no point along its length are pedestrians allowed to cross the road at ground level. Instead, there are a number of footbridges, which also provide access to the tramway stop islands.

Events

Although it is a major road, Queensway is part of the route regularly taken by marches and protests including the annual July 1 marches. As part of the 2014 Hong Kong protests in Admiralty, protesters have occupied all traffic lanes of Queensway beginning 26 September 2014. The protesters have set up barricades to block vehicle access. The Hong Kong police have removed these barricades, and the road was re-opened to traffic in the afternoon of 14 October 2014.

See also 
 List of streets and roads in Hong Kong
 Murray House, in Stanley, which was originally located along the road, before being moved.

References

External links

Admiralty, Hong Kong
Central, Hong Kong
Roads on Hong Kong Island